Four ships of the British Royal Navy have been named HMS Gnat after the insect.

The first  was a  built at Laird's shipyard and launched on 10 May 1856. She was broken up in August 1864.
The second  was a composite screw gunvessel launched at Pembroke Dockyard on 26 November 1867.  She was wrecked on Balabac Island in the South China Sea on 11 November 1868.
 The third  was a small coastal destroyer launched by Thornycroft at Chiswick on 1 December 1906 and sold for scrapping on 9 May 1921.
 The most recent  was an  launched by Lobnitz and Co. Shipyard at Renfrew in Scotland on 3 December 1915. She was torpedoed by a submarine on 21 October 1941 and beached at Alexandria, where she was converted to a fixed anti-aircraft platform. She was broken up in 1945.

References

U-Boat.net

Royal Navy ship names